Erlach District was one of the 26 administrative districts in the canton of Bern, Switzerland. Its capital was Erlach. The district had an area of 96 km² and consists of 12 municipalities:

External links
 Welcome to Erlach Official website 

Former districts of the canton of Bern